Scoil Aireagail (formerly Ballyhale Vocational School) is a mixed-gender Secondary School, situated in Ballyhale, Kilkenny, Ireland.

Ballyhale Vocational School opened in 1959.  Forty students were enrolled and there was just two classrooms.  Students were accepted to study for their Group Certificate Examination.

References

External links

Secondary schools in County Kilkenny
1959 establishments in Ireland
Educational institutions established in 1959